Agua Bendita is a 2010 Philippine romantic fantasy religious-drama television series based on the Liwayway Komiks comic book series of the same name created by Rod Santiago and directed by Malu L. Sevilla, Claudio "Tots" Sanchez-Mariscal IV, Don M. Cuaresma and Jojo A. Saguin. The series stars Andi Eigenmann in her dual role as twin sisters Agua and Bendita Cristi, together with leading men Matteo Guidicelli and Jason Abalos, with an ensemble cast consisting of Vina Morales, John Estrada, Pilar Pilapil, Alessandra De Rossi, Dimples Romana, Carlos Agassi, Pen Medina, Malou Crisologo, Jason Gainza, Malou de Guzman, Bing Loyzaga, Zaijian Jaranilla, and Zoren Legaspi in their supporting roles. The series premiered on ABS-CBN's Primetime Bida nighttime block from February 8 to September 3, 2010, replacing May Bukas Pa and was replaced by 1DOL.

Series overview

Episodes

Prologue

Chapters 1–4

Epilogue

References

Agua Bendita
2010s television-related lists